Skelmersdale and Holland was an urban district in Lancashire, England from 1968 to 1974.  It was created by the merger of Skelmersdale and Upholland urban districts.  In 1974 it was itself merged into the new non-metropolitan district of West Lancashire, under the Local Government Act 1972.

References
https://web.archive.org/web/20071001030722/http://www.visionofbritain.org.uk/relationships.jsp?u_id=10136659&c_id=10001043

History of Lancashire
Districts of England abolished by the Local Government Act 1972
Urban districts of England
Borough of West Lancashire
Skelmersdale